NZXT is an American computer hardware manufacturer based in Los Angeles, California. The company manufactures computer cases, components, and accessories for the PC gaming market.

History
NZXT was founded in 2004 by Johnny Hou producing products specifically for the DIY PC building community. The company's first product was the NZXT Guardian, which was a case featuring a plastic front bezel resembling Transformers toys and lighting effects. Over time, they gradually expanded to other categories of computer hardware, including computer power supplies, computer cooling, motherboards, and streaming devices.

Products
NZXT is most known for its computer cases, but also sells motherboards, power supplies, cooling products, LED lighting, and other accessories marketed towards PC gamers. The company designs and develops their products in Los Angeles, while manufacturing them in Shenzhen.

Cases 
NZXT has been making PC cases since 2003, when they released the Guardian. In 2013, the Phantom 630, 530, and 410 were released.

The S340 was released in 2016 and later featured a collaboration with Razer. The S340 was refreshed in 2016 with the S340 Elite, which featured a tempered glass side panel instead of the acrylic panel of the previous S340. A limited Hyper Beast edition of the S340 Elite was later released. Also in 2016, NZXT released the Manta - A mini-ITX chassis that featured radically different design compared to their case lineup at the time. Later NZXT and Razer stopped their partnership though.

A new line of cases was released in October 2017, consisting of the H700, H400, and the H200. They are minimalist in design, and are constructed from steel with tempered glass side panels. The "i" variants of each case come with decorative LED lighting and a fan controller.

A cheaper case, the H500, was added to the lineup in May 2018.

The H-series cases were refreshed in May 2019. The new revisions introduced a front-panel USB-C port. One of the refreshed cases, the H510 Elite, added a second glass panel on the front of the case.

In February 2020 NZXT released the H1, a compact form factor case. Several months later reports began to emerge of H1 cases catching fire, which were first reported on November 30, 2020 by Gamers Nexus, a popular PC hobbyist YouTube channel. On February 2, 2021, NZXT removed the H1 case from their product lineup, until a permanent solution could be made.

Cooling 

NZXT has multiple all-in-one water cooler products under their Kraken lineup. The first of these was released in 2013, in both 140mm and 280mm sizes. NZXT has since released multiple updates to this lineup, including new coolers in 120mm and 360mm sizes, and improvements to the pumps and radiators. Most recently, they released a new cooler, the Z73, which includes a customizable LED display, and updates to the rest of their AIO lineup.

Motherboards 
NZXT released their own line of motherboards for the Intel Z370 chipset in January 2018. It was praised for its minimalist design, as the circuitry is not exposed; but was initially criticized for its high price. The lineup was refreshed in October 2018 to support the Z390 chipset. The NZXT branded Z390 motherboards were manufactured by Elitegroup while a Z490 one is made by ASRock.

Power supply units 
NZXT began selling power supply units in 2010, before ceasing sales of them in 2016. They re-entered the market in July 2018 with a series of modular digitally-controlled power supplies in a partnership with Seasonic.

Lighting 
NZXT started making their own line of lighting products including RGB & fan controllers, underglow, LED strips, RGB cable combs, and the hue 2 ambient v2 desktop lighting system.

CRFT 
NZXT released the first product on their CRFT line, a series of themed limited edition pc cases, in May 2018. They first started with a partnership case with PlayerUnknown's Battlegrounds, before moving to a "Nuka-Cola" Fallout themed case with Bethesda Softworks. Another PUBG and Fallout series case were released as well as World of Warcraft and Tom Clancy's Rainbow Six themed cases.

Audio 
NZXT started selling their line of audio products in November 2019; they released their headset, audio mixer, and headset stand.

Gaming Accessories 
NZXT released their first product in their gaming accessories line starting with the puck in January 2017 used for cable management and a headset mount. They expanded it later to include mousepads and a sling bag.

BLD
In 2017, NZXT launched a computer building service called BLD. The service asks about what games would be played on it, budget constraints, and customization options before generating a PC build. The build is sold pre-assembled. They offer 4 categories of PC builds. They are Starter, Mini, Streaming, and Creator.

See also

 List of computer hardware manufacturers

References

Computer enclosure companies
Computer power supply unit manufacturers
Electronics companies established in 2004
Companies based in Los Angeles
Computer hardware cooling
Computer hardware companies
Computer companies of the United States